Emily Wei Rales (born 1976) is a Canadian-American art curator. She is the director of Glenstone, an art museum in Potomac, Maryland, which she founded along with her husband, the American businessman Mitchell Rales.

Early life 
Rales was born Emily Wei in 1976 in Vancouver, British Columbia, as the daughter of Chinese immigrants. She became interested in art while studying at Wellesley College in Wellesley, Massachusetts, eventually graduating with a degree in art history and Chinese studies.

Career 
Rales's art career began as an intern at the Solomon R. Guggenheim Museum in New York City. Rales then worked at Barbara Gladstone's gallery and the J.J. Lally & Co gallery in New York, where she specialized in Chinese antiquities. Rales also ran a small non-profit called "Hudson Clearing", which produced small exhibitions in temporary spaces.

Personal life 
Rales met the American businessman Mitchell Rales in 2005 and began to work for him soon after. They married in 2008 and reside at Glenstone in Potomac, Maryland. She is a director of the non-profit Foundation for Contemporary Arts. Rales signed the The Giving Pledge in 2019.

References

External links 
 

Living people
Canadian art curators
American art curators
American women curators
Canadian women curators
Directors of museums in the United States
Wellesley College alumni
People from Vancouver
1976 births
21st-century American women
21st-century Canadian women
Canadian emigrants to the United States
Giving Pledgers